Jacques Rougerie (born May 11, 1948 in Pamiers, France) is a retired French international rugby union player and the father of another French international rugby union player, Aurélien Rougerie.

He played as a Prop or Hooker for AS Montferrand. He made his only test appearance for France on 27 October 1973 against Japan. He is now a dentist in Clermont-Ferrand.

Honours 
 Selected to represent France, 1973
 Challenge Yves du Manoir 1976
 French championship finalist 1970

External links
ESPN profile

French rugby union players
Living people
France international rugby union players
1945 births
People from Pamiers
Sportspeople from Ariège (department)
Rugby union props
Rugby union hookers